The New York Islanders are a professional ice hockey team based in Elmont, NY. They are members of the Metropolitan Division of the National Hockey League's (NHL) Eastern Conference. The Islanders franchise has been a part of the NHL since their inception in 1972, playing their home games at Nassau Veterans Memorial Coliseum from 1972-2015 and 2018-21, Barclays Center from 2015-20 and have played at UBS Arena since 2021. The team has had six general managers since their inception in 1972.

Key

General managers

See also
List of NHL general managers

Notes
 A running total of the number of general managers of the franchise. Thus any general manager who has two or more separate terms as general manager is only counted once. Interim general managers do not count towards the total.

References

New York Islanders
New York Islanders general managers
general managers